Mescinia parvula is a species of snout moth in the genus Mescinia. It was described by Zeller in 1881, and is known from Belize (including the Mountain Pine Ridge) and Colombia (including Honda, Tolima).

References

Moths described in 1881
Phycitinae